The 2018–19 Belgian Second Amateur Division is the third season of the division in its current format, placed at the fourth-tier of football in Belgium.

The division consists of three separate leagues, each containing 16 teams. Leagues A and B consist of teams with a license from the Voetbalfederatie Vlaanderen (VFV, the Flemish/Dutch speaking wing of the Belgian FA), while league C contains teams with a license from the Association des Clubs Francophones de Football (ACFF, the French speaking wing of the RBFA). The champions from each of the three leagues will promote to the 2019–20 Belgian First Amateur Division. The fixtures were announced in July 2018.

Team changes

In
 Berchem and Patro Eisden Maasmechelen after finishing in the relegation zone in the 2017–18 Belgian First Amateur Division.
 Hamme was also relegated from the 2017–18 Belgian First Amateur Division after losing the Second Amateur Division promotion play-offs, where the team failed to regain its place in the First Amateur Division.
 Menen was promoted after winning the 2017–18 Belgian Third Amateur Division A.
 Heur-Tongeren was promoted after winning the 2017–18 Belgian Third Amateur Division B.
 La Louvière was promoted after winning the 2017–18 Belgian Third Amateur Division C.
 Tilleur was promoted after winning the 2017–18 Belgian Third Amateur Division D.
 Diegem, Dikkelvenne and Eppegem were promoted as winners of the Third Amateur Division promotion play-offs VFV.
 Couvin-Mariembourg, Francs Borains and Visé were promoted as winners of the Third Amateur Division promotion play-offs ACFF.

Out
 Rupel Boom was promoted after winning the 2017–18 Belgian Second Amateur Division A.
 Tessenderlo was promoted after winning the 2017–18 Belgian Second Amateur Division B.
 RWDM was promoted after winning the 2017–18 Belgian Second Amateur Division C.
 RFC Liège was promoted after winning the Second Amateur Division promotion play-offs.
 Bornem, La Calamine, Pepingen-Halle, Sint-Lenaarts, Sprimont Comblain, Tienen, Torhout, WS Brussels and Zwarte Leeuw were all relegated after finishing in the relegation positions the previous season.

Belgian Second Amateur Division A

League table

Belgian Second Amateur Division B

League table

Belgian Second Amateur Division C

League table

Promotion play-offs

Promotion play-offs VFV
The teams finishing in second place in the Second Amateur Division A and Second Amateur Division B will take part in a promotion playoff first round together with three period winners from both divisions. These 8 teams from the VFV will play the first round of a promotion-playoff, with two teams qualifying for the Promotion play-offs Final. 

In division A, champions Sint-Eloois Winkel and runners-up Mandel United together won all periods. As a result, Mandel United was joined in the play-offs by the next three teams in the standings: Petegem, Gent-Zeehaven and Wijgmaal. In division B, only Hasselt and Bocholt has received a licence, with the two other spots remaining vacant. Overall this meant only six out of eight teams took part, therefore two teams were drawn to receive a bye into the second round: Gent-Zeehaven and Wijgmaal.

VFV Round 1

Bocholt and Ronse qualified for the VFV second round promotion play-offs.

VFV Round 2

Ronse and Wijgmaal qualified for the promotion play-offs Final.

Promotion play-offs ACFF
The team finishing in second place in the Second Amateur Division C will take part in the promotion playoff first round together with three period winners. These 4 teams will play the first round of a promotion-playoff, with the winner qualifying for the Promotion play-offs Final. As champions La Louvière Centre won all three periods, this implied that normally the teams in positions 2 through 5 would take part in the playoffs, however both Hamoir and Rebecq were replaced as they did not receive (or apply for) a licence. Tilleur and La Louvière took their spot instead.

ACFF Round 1

The two winning teams meet each other in round 2, the losing teams remain in the Belgian Second Amateur Division.

ACFF Round 2

Visé qualified for the promotion play-offs Final.

Promotion play-offs Final
The two winners of the Promotion play-offs on the VFV side (Ronse and Wijgmaal) and the winning team from the ACFF Promotion play-offs (Visé) will play a final tournament together with the team that finished in 14th place in the 2018–19 Belgian First Amateur Division (Oudenaarde). The winner of this play-off promotes to (or remains in) the 2019–20 Belgian First Amateur Division. As Oudenaarde is a team from the VFV side, there will be an extra VFV team relegating from the 2018–19 Belgian Second Amateur Division in case a team from the ACFF side (Visé) gets promoted.

Final Round 1

2–2 on aggregate. Ronse won on away goals.

Visé won 8–4 on aggregate, Oudenaarde was relegated to the 2019–20 Belgian Second Amateur Division.

Final Round 2

2–2 on aggregate. Visé won on away goals and is promoted to the 2019–20 Belgian First Amateur Division.

Relegation play-offs
The number of teams relegating from the Belgian Amateur Second Division in each wing (VFV and ACFF) depends on the number of teams of each wing relegating from the Belgian First Amateur Division. 

Upon completion of the 2018–19 Belgian First Amateur Division, with three VFV teams were relegated automatically, it was already known there would be at least one additional VFV team relegating from the 2018–19 Belgian Second Amateur Division. In case Oudenaarde, taking part in the Second Amateur Division Promotion play-offs Final and also from VFV side is also relegated and is replaced by a team from ACFF side, then a second VFV team will be relegated from the 2018–19 Belgian Second Amateur Division. On ACFF side on the other hand, no extra relegations would be necessary and only the three bottom teams in division C would be relegated.

Relegation play-offs VFV
The teams finishing 14th in divisions A and B played each other in a single match to avoid relegation, with the losing team relegated and the winning team having to await the result of the Second Amateur Division Promotion play-offs Final.

City Pirates were relegated, three weeks later Eppegem was relegated as well as ACFF team Visé got promoted, resulting in an extra team from VFV to be relegated.

Relegation play-offs ACFF
As there is only one division no playoff was organised. However due to the fact that only teams from the VFV side were being relegated from the 2018–19 Belgian First Amateur Division, no extra relegations took place.

References

Belgian Second Amateur Division
Bel
4